Eleanor Updale (born 1953) is an English fiction writer, best known for the Victorian-era London thriller Montmorency (2003) and its sequels, the Montmorency series, which feature the namesake fictional character, Montmorency.

Personal life and education
Eleanor Updale was born in 1953 and grew up in Camberwell in South London. She studied history at St Anne's College, Oxford in the 1970s. She studied for an M.Res. degree at the Centre for Editing Lives and Letters at Queen Mary College, University of London in 2003. Her research into early members of the Royal Society was awarded a PhD in History by the university in 2007. She is also a trustee of the charity Listening Books.

Updale is married to broadcaster James Naughtie. The couple have three children.

Career in broadcasting
Updale was a producer of television and radio current affairs programmes for the BBC from 1975 to 1990.

Novels
The novel, Montmorency was her first book, published by Scholastic Corporation in 2003. It was followed by three sequels, with a final, fifth, volume published in 2013.

 Montmorency series, published by Scholastic Corporation in the U.K. and subsequently by its Orchard Books imprint in the U.S.
Montmorency: thief, liar, gentleman? (2003)
 Montmorency on the Rocks: doctor, aristocrat, murderer? (2004)
 Montmorency and the Assassins: master, criminal, spy? (2005) – "the final installment of the Montmorency trilogy"
 Montmorency's Revenge: madman, actor, arsonist? (2006)
 Montmorency's Return (2013)

She has also written books with other characters.
 Itch, Scritch, Scratch, illustrated by Sarah Horne (Barrington Stoke, 2008),  – picture book
 Saved (Barrington Stoke, 2008)
 Johnny Swanson (David Fickling Books, 2010) – "in 1929 England"
 The Last Minute (David Fickling, 2013)

References

External links

 
 

1953 births
Living people
British children's writers
British historical novelists
Alumni of St Anne's College, Oxford
Alumni of Queen Mary University of London
Date of birth missing (living people)
Place of birth missing (living people)